Clarkston High School is Public high school located at 618 North Indian Creek Drive in Clarkston, Georgia, United States, in central DeKalb County.

Clarkston High School has a diverse student body from more than 54 countries. Students were reported to speak 47 languages there in 2014. CHS has DeKalb School System's only hearing impaired program for high school students.

The school mascot is the Angora and the school colors are green and gold.

References

DeKalb County School District high schools